A population centre, in Canadian census data, is a populated place, or a cluster of interrelated populated places, which meets the demographic characteristics of an urban area, having a population of at least 1,000 people and a population density of no fewer than 400 persons per square km2.

The term was first introduced in the Canada 2011 Census; prior to that, Statistics Canada used the term urban area.

In the 2021 Census of Population, Statistics Canada listed 27 population centres in the province of Newfoundland and Labrador. This includes the new population centres of Sheshatshiu and Stephenville Crossing.

List 
The below table is a list of those population centres in Newfoundland and Labrador from the 2021 Census of Population as designated, named, and delineated by Statistics Canada.

Retired population centres 
The former population centres of Humber Arm South, Fortune and Upper Island Cove were retired for the 2021 census.

See also 
List of the largest population centres in Canada

References 

Population centres